2015 Kidal attack may refer to one of two deadly attacks in Kidal, Mali, in 2015:
March 2015 Kidal attack
November 2015 Kidal attack